Onychothemis testacea, Stellate river hawk, riverhawker, is a species of dragonfly in the family Libellulidae. It is widespread in many Asian countries.

Description
It is a medium sized dragonfly with bottle-green eyes. Its thorax is dark metallic-blue, marked with citron-yellow. There is a narrow mid-dorsal carina, a humeral spot and a narrow stripe on mesepimeron. Abdomen is black, marked with citron-yellow. Segment 1 has a triangular spot on mid-dorsum. Ssegment 2 has a small diamond-shaped spot on mid-dorsum. Segment 3 has its base
dorsally and sub-dorsally narrow yellow and a stellate spot on mid-dorsum. Segments 4 to 9 are similar to 3; but the lateral spots much smaller. Segment 10 is entirely black. Anal appendages are black. Female is similar to the male.

Habitat
It breeds in streams in forest or at its margins. This is a very fast flying dragonfly of forested streams. Males usually perch on dry twigs and other similar vantage points over streams and aggressively chase other dragonflies entering their territory.

See also 
 List of odonates of Sri Lanka
 List of odonates of India
 List of odonata of Kerala

References

Libellulidae